Battle of Cecora may refer to:

 Battle of Cecora (1595)
 Battle of Cecora (1620)